George Sigerson (11 January 1836 – 17 February 1925) was an Irish physician, scientist, writer, politician and poet. He was a leading light in the Irish Literary Revival of the late 19th century in Ireland.

Doctor and scientist
Sigerson was born at Holy Hill, near Strabane in County Tyrone, the son of William and Nancy (née Neilson) Sigerson. He had had three brothers James, John and William, and three sisters, Ellen, Jane and Mary Ann. He attended Letterkenny Academy but was sent by his father, William, who developed the spade mill and who played an active role in the development of Artigarvan, to complete his education in France.

He studied medicine at the Queen's College, Galway, and Queen's College, Cork, and took his degree in 1859. He then went to Paris where he spent some time studying under Charcot and Duchenne at the Salpêtrière; a fellow-student was Sigmund Freud. Sigerson published successful translations of Charcot's Clinical Lectures in 1877 and 1881.

He returned to Ireland and opened a practice in Dublin, specializing as a neurologist. He continued to visit France annually to study under Charcot. His patients included Maud Gonne, Austin Clarke and Nora Barnacle. He lectured on medicine at the Catholic University of Ireland. He was professor of zoology and later botany at the University College Dublin.

Cultural nationalist
While a student he taught himself Irish and made the acquaintance of Charles Kickham and John O'Leary.

His first book, The Poets and Poetry of Munster, appeared in 1860. He was actively involved in political journalism for many years, writing for The Nation. Sigerson and his wife Hester were by now among the dominant figures of the Gaelic Revival. They frequently held Sunday evening salons at their Dublin home, No. 3 Clare St, to which artists, intellectuals and rebels alike attended, including O'Leary, Yeats, Patrick Pearse, Roger Casement and 1916 signatory Thomas MacDonagh. Sigerson was a co-founder of the Feis Ceoil and President of the National Literary Society from 1893 until his death. His daughter, Dora, was a poet who was also involved in the Irish literary revival.

Nominated for a twelve-year term to the first Senate of the Irish Free State, Sigerson briefly served as the first chairman on 11–12 December 1922 before the election of Lord Glenavy. On 18 February 1925, the day after his death, the Senate paid tribute to him.

GAA supporter
The Sigerson Cup, the top division of third level Gaelic Football competition in Ireland is named in his honour. Sigerson donated the salary from his post at UCD so that a trophy could be purchased for the competition. In 2009, he was named in the Sunday Tribune'''s list of the "125 Most Influential People In GAA History". The cup was first presented in 1911, with the inaugural winners being UCD.

Death

George Sigerson died at his home in 3 Clare Street, Dublin, on 17 February 1925, aged 89, after a short illness. He was predeceased by his wife, Hester Varian, whom he married at St. Mary's Pro-Cathedral, Marlborough Street, Dublin, on 1 December 1861. She published poems and short stories in various journals and wrote one novel A Ruined Race (1889, Ward & Downey). She died in 1898. The couple had four children. One of these, William, predeceased both parents; two others (George Patrick and the poet and sculptor Dora Maria) would predecease their father. Only one of George and Hester Sigerson's children, Anna Hester, also a writer, like her parents and sister, outlived them both.Profile (with dates of birth and death of children), findagrave.com; accessed 8 July 2015.

Partial bibliography
 The Poets and Poetry of Munster (1860)
 Cannabiculture in Ireland; its profit and possibility (1866)
 Modern Ireland (1869)
 Political prisoners at home and abroad On the need for village hospitals in Ireland Celtic influence on the evolution of rimed hymns The advantages of Ambidexterity Discovery of fish remains in the alluvial clay of the River Foyle Bards of the Gael and Gall (1897)
 Fare Thee Well Enniskillen, trad., adapted by George Sigerson, (1894).
 The Mountains of Pomeroy by George Sigerson.

Further reading
 
 McGilloway, K., George Sigerson: Poet, Patriot Scientist and Scholar'', Ulster Historical Foundation, 2011

References

External links
 
 
George Sigerson Papers at the Newberry

1836 births
1925 deaths
Academics of University College Dublin
Burials at Glasnevin Cemetery
Independent members of Seanad Éireann
Irish neurologists
Irish poets
Members of the 1922 Seanad
People from County Tyrone
George
19th-century Irish people